Ardh is an Indian Hindi-language drama film written and directed by Palash Muchhal. It stars Rajpal Yadav and Rubina Dilaik. The film premiered on ZEE5 on 10 June 2022.

Cast
 Rajpal Yadav as Shiva
 Rubina Dilaik as Madhu
 Hiten Tejwani as Satya
 Kulbhushan Kharbanda as himself (Cameo Appearance)
 Swastik Tiwari as Aniruddh
 Yogesh Lakhani

Soundtrack

The music of the film is composed by Palash Munchal with lyrics  written by Palak Muchhal,  Kunaal Vermaa, Palash Muchhal, Parry and Kuwar Virk.

Reception
The film received mixed reviews from critics who criticized its writing, direction and other technical aspects although Rajpal's performance was well received.

References

External links 
 
 

2020s Hindi-language films
2022 drama films
2022 films
Indian drama films